The Ukrainian Republic Capella (later known as the Ukrainian National Chorus) was a musical company during and after World War I which toured Europe and North America with the intent to promote Ukrainian culture abroad. The main sponsor of the Capella was Symon Petlura.

Background
During World War I, many events shook Eastern Europe. In Ukraine, a new chance to create an independent state presented itself. One of the key figures in this period was Symon Petlura. Petlura thought that many people may want to contribute to the promotion of Ukrainian culture, and realized that not everybody would be a good soldier. In order to include the greatest number of people into the process of statehood, Petlura organized a series of cultural programs, funded by the central Directorate of Ukraine, to actively promote Ukrainian culture abroad. One such initiative was the Ukrainian Republic Capella.

Beginning
In January 1919, Petlura held a meeting with Oleksander Koshetz and Kyrylo Stetsenko and presented the idea. Soon after this meeting, Oleksa Prykhodko also joined the Capella as assistant director.

The situation of the Capella was difficult in that the political situation in Kyiv was unstable. Although Koshetz and Stetsenko began work almost immediately, on January 26, 1919, Koshetz was forced to leave Kyiv before it was overrun by the bolsheviks.

The Capella eventually reunited in Kamyanets-Podilsky, where the final preparations were made.

First European Tour
The first tour of the Ukrainian Republic Capella started on April 26, 1919 in Czechoslovakia. The first concert was performed  on May 20, 1919.

The tour continued from Czechoslovakia to Switzerland, France, Belgium, the Netherlands, and England.

Second European Tour
Even though the Capella as a choir was receiving triumphant reviews, personality conflicts between Koshetz and Prykhodko led to a split. In the fall of 1920, Prykhodko and 20 members of the Capella returned to Czechoslovakia.
However, Koshetz received further funding from Petlura, and Koshetz recruited Ukrainians living in Poland to the Capella.

The new Capella toured France, Spain, and Belgium.

Dissolution
In May 1921, Oleksander Koshetz announced the dissolution of the Ukrainian Republic Capella.

Later that year, Koshetz and some other members of the Capella created the Ukrainian National Chorus.

Legacy
The Ukrainian National Chorus, which toured the United States and Canada between 1922 and 1926 is credited with introducing the Ukrainian Christmas Carol "Shchedryk" - known as the "Carol of the Bells" in English.

References

Klymkiw, Walter, "Olexander Koshetz Ukraine's Great Choral Conductor", Forum, Winter, 1986, pp 15–21

National choirs
Musical groups established in 1919